Washington's 5th congressional district encompasses the Eastern Washington counties of Ferry, Stevens, Pend Oreille, Lincoln, Spokane, Whitman, Walla Walla, Columbia, Garfield, and Asotin, along with parts of Adams and Franklin.  It is centered on Spokane, the state's second largest city.

Since 2005, the 5th district has been represented in the U.S. House of Representatives by Cathy McMorris Rodgers, a Republican. Rodgers's predecessor, George Nethercutt, defeated Democrat Tom Foley, then Speaker of the House, in the 1994 elections; Foley had held the seat since 1965.

In presidential elections, the 5th district was once fairly competitive, but in recent years has generally been a safe bet for the Republicans. Although George W. Bush carried the district with 57% in 2000 and 2004, John McCain just narrowly won the district with 52% of the vote, while Barack Obama received 46% in 2008. In 2012, President Obama's share of the vote dropped to 44%.

The first election in the 5th district was in 1914, won by Democrat Clarence Dill.  Following the 1910 census, Washington gained two seats in the U.S. House, from three to five, but did not reapportion for the 1912 election. The two new seats were elected as statewide at-large, with each voter casting ballots for three congressional seats, their district and two at-large. After that election, the state was reapportioned to five districts for the 1914 election. The state's 6th district was added after the 1930 census and first contested in the 1932 election.

Recent results from statewide races

List of members representing the district

Recent election results

2012

2014

2016

2018

2020

2022

See also
United States House of Representatives elections in Washington, 2010
United States House of Representatives elections in Washington, 2012
United States House of Representatives elections in Washington, 2014
United States House of Representatives elections in Washington, 2016
United States House of Representatives elections in Washington, 2018
United States House of Representatives elections in Washington, 2020
United States House of Representatives elections in Washington, 2022

References

 Congressional Biographical Directory of the United States 1774–present

External links
Washington State Redistricting Commission
Find your new congressional district: a searchable map, Seattle Times, January 13, 2012

05